John Turner (circa 1816 – 30 July 1858) was an English first-class cricketer and clergyman.

The son of John Turner senior, he was born at Bloomsbury circa 1816. He was educated at Winchester College, before going up to Balliol College, Oxford. While studying at Oxford, he played first-class cricket for Oxford University on two occasions in 1837, both against the Marylebone Cricket Club at Oxford and Lord's respectively. He scored a total of 64 runs in his two matches, with a high score of 35. 

After graduating from Oxford, he took holy orders in the Church of England. He was the rector of Tiffield in Northamptonshire from 1853, until his death at Southampton in July 1858.

References

External links

Date of birth unknown
1858 deaths
People from Bloomsbury
People educated at Winchester College
Alumni of Balliol College, Oxford
English cricketers
Oxford University cricketers
19th-century English Anglican priests